Dhananjay Panditrao Munde (born 15 July 1975) is an Indian politician, who is currently a member of the Nationalist Congress Party (NCP), and was appointed cabinet minister in Uddhav Thackeray's Maharashtra State Government.

Early life and education 
Munde was born on 15 July 1975 in Nathra, Parli Vaijnath, Beed in a Vanjari family. Munde's family consists of his mother, Rukmini Munde, wife Rajshri Munde and daughter Adishri Munde.

Political career
Munde won the 2019 assembly elections from Parli constituency. He is the Guardian Minister of Beed District and the Minister of Social Justice and Special Assistance of the State of Maharashtra. On 24 December 2019, as the Minister for Social Justice and Special Assistance. Earlier, he had held the role of opposition leader in the Legislative Council of Maharashtra.

Personal life 
Dhananjay Munde is married to Rajshri Munde.

Controversy
In January 2021, a rape complaint was filed against Munde by singer Renu Sharma which was subsequently withdrawn. Munde refuted the rape allegations and dismissed opposition demands to resign. In a press release, Munde claimed that he is in a relationship with Renu Sharma's sister, Karuna Sharma and even had two children out of that relationship which was known to his wife and family.

See also

 Sundarrao Solanke
 Gopinath Munde

References

Members of the Maharashtra Legislative Council
Living people
1975 births
People from Beed district
Bharatiya Janata Party politicians from Maharashtra
Nationalist Congress Party politicians from Maharashtra
Leaders of the Opposition in the Maharashtra Legislative Council
Maharashtra politicians
Dr. Babasaheb Ambedkar Marathwada University alumni